François Gayot (July 17, 1927 – December 16, 2010) was the Catholic archbishop of the Roman Catholic Archdiocese of Cap-Haïtien. Haiti.

Ordained to the priesthood in 1954, Gayot was named bishop of the then Cap-Haïtien Diocese. In 1988 the Diocese was elevated to an archdiocese. Archbishop Gayot retired in 2003 and died in 2010.

Notes

1927 births
2010 deaths
20th-century Roman Catholic bishops in Haiti
20th-century Roman Catholic archbishops in Haiti
21st-century Roman Catholic archbishops in Haiti
Haitian Roman Catholic archbishops
Roman Catholic bishops of Cap-Haïtien
Roman Catholic archbishops of Cap-Haïtien